Alexandra Rickham (born 11 September 1981) is a British Paralympic sailor.

Personal life
Rickham was born on 11 September 1981 in Kingston, Jamaica.

She is a tetraplegic athlete who became disabled as a result of a shallow diving accident in 1995.

Sailing
Rickham competed in the 2008 Paralympic Sailing Competition in the SKUD 18 two person keelboat class, where she finished in fifth place. In 2011 following back to back IFDS World Championship wins she was shortlisted by the International Sailing Federation for the ISAF World Sailor of the Year Awards.

Rickham was selected to represent Great Britain at the 2012 Summer Paralympics held in London, United Kingdom. She competed in the SKUD 18 - 2 person keelboat event, alongside teammate Niki Birrell. The duo started strongly, winning two of the first five races, but form slipped slightly in the later races but their performance was still good enough to win the bronze medal.

References

External links
 
 

1981 births
Living people
British female sailors (sport)
Paralympic sailors of Great Britain
Paralympic bronze medalists for Great Britain
Paralympic medalists in sailing
Sailors at the 2008 Summer Paralympics
Sailors at the 2012 Summer Paralympics
Sailors at the 2016 Summer Paralympics
Medalists at the 2012 Summer Paralympics
Medalists at the 2016 Summer Paralympics
Team Bath Paralympic athletes
Sportspeople from Kingston, Jamaica